Radion Aksanovich Gataullin (born on 23 November 1965) is a retired pole vaulter who represented the Soviet Union and later Russia. He is the 1988 Olympic silver medallist, the 1987 World bronze medallist, a two-time European champion (1990/94) and a two-time World Indoor champion (1989/93). He is also a former world indoor record holder with clearances of 6.00m and 6.02m in 1989.

Career
Born in Tashkent, Uzbek SSR, Soviet Union), Gautaullin trained at Burevestnik in Tashkent and represented the USSR and later Russia. He is of Tatar origin.

Gataullin was the second vaulter to break the 6.00 metre barrier after Sergey Bubka, and was the first vaulter to clear 6.00 metres indoors, first achieving it on 22 January 1989 in Leningrad, before improving his personal best jumps to 6.02 metres (indoors) on 4 February 1989 in Gomel and 6.00 metres (outdoors) on 16 September 1989 in Tokyo. He would also achieve 6.00 metre clearances twice more indoors (both February 1993) and twice more outdoors in June 1993 and August 1994.

He later became the national pole vault coach of Russia. His younger brother Ruslan Gataullin has represented Russia in the long jump. He is married to Tatyana Reshetnikova, an Olympic hurdler for Russia. Their daughter Aksana Gataullina is the current U20 European champion in pole vault.

Achievements

See also
6 metres club

References

External links 
 

1965 births
Living people
Uzbekistani male pole vaulters
Soviet male pole vaulters
Russian male pole vaulters
Athletes (track and field) at the 1988 Summer Olympics
Olympic athletes of the Soviet Union
Olympic silver medalists for the Soviet Union
Russian athletics coaches
Burevestnik (sports society) athletes
Sportspeople from Tashkent
Uzbekistani people of Tatar descent
World Athletics Championships athletes for the Soviet Union
World Athletics Championships medalists
European Athletics Championships medalists
Medalists at the 1988 Summer Olympics
Olympic silver medalists in athletics (track and field)
Universiade medalists in athletics (track and field)
Goodwill Games medalists in athletics
Universiade gold medalists for the Soviet Union
Universiade silver medalists for the Soviet Union
Soviet Athletics Championships winners
World Athletics Indoor Championships winners
Tatar sportspeople
Russian people of Uzbekistani descent
Medalists at the 1985 Summer Universiade
Medalists at the 1987 Summer Universiade
Competitors at the 1986 Goodwill Games
Competitors at the 1990 Goodwill Games